Alexander Fischer was a Russian figure skater who competed in pair skating.

He resided in Saint Petersburg.

In 1908, Fischer and his partner, Lidia Popova, participated in the first ever World Pairs Figure Skating Championship and won the bronze medal, thus becoming the first Russian skaters to win a medal in pairs skating at World Championships. The pair was coached by Nikolai Panin.

Competitive highlights 

'''With Lidia Popova

References

External links 
 Alexander Fischer at Fskate.ru

Russian male pair skaters
Figure skaters from Saint Petersburg
Year of birth missing
Year of death missing